Paullinia is a genus of flowering shrubs, small trees and lianas in the soapberry family, Sapindaceae, native to tropical South America, Central America and the Caribbean.

The genus is named after the German medical botanist Christian Franz Paullini, who discovered the genus in the Caribbean in the 18th century.

Selected species
Paullinia alata
Paullinia cupana Kunth - Guaraná (Amazon Basin)
Paullinia cururu
Paullinia fuscescens
Paullinia navicularis Radlk. (Ecuador)
Paullinia paullinioides
Paullinia pinnata
Paullinia plumieri
Paullinia weinmannifolia
Paullinia yoco - Yoco

Uses
Several uses are recorded. The fruit of several species are edible, with P. cupana (Guaraná) being the most popular. Other species, notably P. yoco (Yoco), are used as herbal medicine for various treatments. The sap of some species, notably P. cururu is highly toxic, and is used as an arrow poison by Native American tribes in South America. Similarly, the long flexible stems of Paullinia pinnata are used to poison fish in shallow pools, as described by the English naturalist Henry Walter Bates in his book The Naturalist on the River Amazons.

References

 
Sapindaceae genera